Mackenzie Hughes (born November 23, 1990) is a Canadian professional golfer.

Early life and amateur career
Hughes was born in Hamilton, Ontario. He is a graduate of Kent State University. He won the 2011 and 2012 Canadian Amateur Championship.

Hughes was the number one Canadian Amateur in 2011. He was a member of Team Canada's National Squad in  2008, 2011, and 2012.

Professional career
Hughes turned professional in 2012 and played on the eGolf Professional Tour and PGA Tour Canada. He played in 2012 and 2013 Canadian Opens but missed the cut in both events.

In June 2013, Hughes qualified for the U.S. Open, winning a playoff at his sectional qualifying site. He won his first professional tournament at the 2013 Cape Breton Celtic Classic on PGA Tour Canada. He would go on to win the 2013 PGA Tour Canada Order of Merit and earn a Web.com Tour card for 2014, fully exempt as the money leader. Hughes made seven cuts in twenty events, finishing well outside retaining any status. After spending the 2015 season on PGA Tour Canada, he earned Web.com Tour status for 2016 through Q School. In August 2016, he won the Price Cutter Charity Championship en route to graduating to the PGA Tour for the 2016–17 season.

In November 2016, in his fifth PGA Tour start as a member, Hughes won the RSM Classic, becoming the first Canadian-born golfer to win on the PGA Tour since Nick Taylor at the 2014 Sanderson Farms Championship, and the first to win a non-alternate event since Mike Weir at the 2007 Fry's Electronics Open. He was also the first rookie in over 20 years (Tim Herron at the 1996 Honda Classic) to win wire-to-wire.

In 2017, he finished 10th at the AT&T Pebble Beach Pro-Am, 16th at The Players Championship, and 13th at the Dell Technologies Championship.

In March 2019, Hughes finished tied for second at the PGA Tour's Corales Puntacana Resort and Club Championship. He lost by one stroke to winner Graeme McDowell.

In March 2020, Hughes finished second at The Honda Classic finishing one stroke behind champion Im Sung-jae. He shot 66-66 on the weekend. In June he finished tied for third place in the Travelers Championship and entered the top 100 in the world rankings for the first time.

Hughes held the lead after the third round at the 2021 U.S. Open but finished T15. He was also in contention at the 2021 Open Championship, eventually finishing T6 and recording the best ever finish for a Canadian at The Open Championship.

In October 2022, Hughes won his second PGA Tour title at the Sanderson Farms Championship in a playoff over Sepp Straka.

Amateur wins
2010 Fireline Towson Invitational, Bank of Tennessee
2011 Canadian Amateur, Glencoe Invitational, Mid-American Conference Championship
2012 Canadian Amateur

Professional wins (4)

PGA Tour wins (2)

PGA Tour playoff record (2–0)

Web.com Tour wins (1)

PGA Tour Canada wins (1)

Results in major championships
Results not in chronological order in 2020.

CUT = missed the half-way cut
"T" = tied
NT = No tournament due to COVID-19 pandemic

Summary

Most consecutive cuts made – 3 (2021 U.S. Open – 2022 Masters)
Longest streak of top-10s – 1 (2021 Open)

Results in The Players Championship

CUT = missed the halfway cut
"T" indicates a tie for a place
C = Canceled after the first round due to the COVID-19 pandemic

Results in World Golf Championships

1Cancelled due to COVID-19 pandemic

QF, R16, R32, R64 = Round in which player lost in match play
NT = No tournament
"T" = Tied
Note that the Championship and Invitational were discontinued from 2022.

Team appearances
Amateur
Eisenhower Trophy (representing Canada): 2012

See also
2016 Web.com Tour Finals graduates

References

External links

Kent State profile

Canadian male golfers
PGA Tour golfers
Olympic golfers of Canada
Golfers at the 2020 Summer Olympics
Korn Ferry Tour graduates
Kent State Golden Flashes men's golfers
Golfing people from Ontario
Canadian expatriates in the United States
People from Dundas, Ontario
Sportspeople from Hamilton, Ontario
1990 births
Living people